Hugo Werner-Kahle (5 August 1882 – 1 May 1961) was a German stage and film actor (and sporadically, a movie director). He appeared in around a hundred films during his career.

Selected filmography
 Midnight (1918)
 The Bracelet (1918)
 Europe, General Delivery (1918)
 The Count of Cagliostro (1920)
 Biribi (1922)
 Money in the Streets (1922)
 Tabitha, Stand Up (1922)
 Miss Madame (1923)
 Friend Ripp (1923)
 The Lost Soul, or: The Dangers of Hypnosis (1923)
 Modern Vices (1924)
 The Other Woman (1924)
 Hunted Men (1924)
 A Woman for 24 Hours (1925)
 The Uninvited Guest (1925)
 Shadows of the Metropolis (1925)
 Cock of the Roost (1925)
 The Woman with That Certain Something (1925)
 Accommodations for Marriage (1926)
 The Pride of the Company (1926)
 We'll Meet Again in the Heimat (1926)
 The Ride in the Sun (1926)
 Department Store Princess (1926)
 The Great Unknown (1927)
 Aftermath (1927)
 The Awakening of Woman (1927)
 Modern Pirates (1928)
 Adam and Eve (1928)
 Fair Game (1928)
 Yacht of the Seven Sins (1928)
 The Strange Night of Helga Wangen (1928)
 The Man with the Frog (1929)
 Painted Youth (1929)
 Lux, King of Criminals (1929)
 Distinguishing Features (1929)
 Revolt in the Reformatory (1929)
 A Mother's Love (1929)
 Dear Homeland (1929)
 Come Back, All Is Forgiven (1929)
 Affair at the Grand Hotel (1929)
 The Road to Dishonour (1930)
 Louise, Queen of Prussia (1931)
 Checkmate (1931)
 The Mad Bomberg (1932)
 The Heath Is Green (1932)
 One Too Many on Board (1935)
 Fresh Wind from Canada (1935)
 Punks Arrives from America (1935)
 Moscow-Shanghai (1936)
 Ninety Minute Stopover (1936)
 A Woman of No Importance (1936)
 The Yellow Flag (1937)
 Togger (1937)
 The Muzzle (1938)
 Our Miss Doctor (1940)
 The Roedern Affair (1944)

References

Bibliography
 Soister, John T. Conrad Veidt on Screen: A Comprehensive Illustrated Filmography. McFarland, 2002.

External links

1882 births
1961 deaths
German male film actors
German male stage actors
German male silent film actors
20th-century German male actors
People from Aachen